Langler is a surname. Notable people with the surname include:

Alfred Langler (1865–1928), Australian journalist and newspaper editor
Max Langler (1905–1950), Mexican film actor

See also
Langer
Langley (surname)